Shane Nolan is a hurler from County Kerry. He has played with the Kerry intercounty team and with his local Crotta O'Neill's club.

He first made his made in 2009, helping Kerry to win All Ireland Minor and Under 21 B titles. He won a second Under 21 title in 2010 as captain of the team. In 2011, he won a third All Ireland B title and was awarded "man of the match" when they beat Westmeath.

He first came on the senior team in 2010, helping Kerry win Div 3A of the National Hurling League and later in the year Kerry made it to the Christy Ring Cup final but lost out to Westmeath. He and Kerry returned the following year, and made no mistake second time round and beat Wicklow in the final. He later picked up the Christy Ring Cup Player of the Year award; He was the first Kerry player to win it. In 2013, he played in his third final in four years but was on the losing side this time to Down, at the end of the year he picked up a Christy Ring All Star.

He was part of the Under 21 Hurling/Shinty International team and was captain of the team in 2012.

At club level, Crotta O'Neill's won the County League Div 1 title in 2010 beating County Championships Ballyduff in the final. In 2011 he helped Crotta O'Neill's to their first County Championship final in 12 years. Despite scoring 0-13 of his sides 0-15 and picking up the Man of the Match award Crotta ended up the wrong side of a 2-11 to 0-15 scoreline.

Career statistics

References
 http://hoganstand.com/kerry/ArticleForm.aspx?ID=117674
 http://hoganstand.com/kerry/ArticleForm.aspx?ID=99578
 http://hoganstand.com/kerry/ArticleForm.aspx?ID=131367
 http://hoganstand.com/kerry/ArticleForm.aspx?ID=126892
 http://hoganstand.com/kerry/ArticleForm.aspx?ID=116459
 http://www.kerrygaa.ie/index.php?option=com_content&view=article&id=2502:shane-nolan-is-christy-ring-player-of-the-year&catid=48:team-news-senior-hurling&Itemid=53

Kerry inter-county hurlers
Crotta O'Neill's hurlers
Year of birth missing (living people)
Living people